Bicton can refer to:
United Kingdom
Bicton, Devon, England
Bicton College
Bicton House, a country house on the campus of Bicton College
Bicton, Herefordshire, England
Bicton, Shrewsbury, Shropshire (a village and parish), England
Bicton, South Shropshire, England
Bicton, Pembrokeshire, Wales

Australia
Bicton, Western Australia
Electoral district of Bicton